The Municipal Commissioner of Mumbai is the chief executive officer of the Brihanmumbai Municipal Corporation. Though the Mayor is the head of the house, his role is largely ceremonial and almost all powers are vested in the Commissioner. The Municipal Commissioner maintains Mumbai, and thus has responsibilities over the sewage system, the school divisions, power companies, roads, and other aspects of local infrastructure. The BEST and the Mumbai Fire Brigade are autonomous bodies under the organization. The commissioner is an Indian Administrative Service officer appointed by the Maharashtra state government. Mr. Iqbal Chahal, is the current Municipal Commissioner of Mumbai.

List of municipal commissioners

See also
 Municipal Corporation of Greater Mumbai(MCGM) or Brihanmumbai Municipal Corporation (BMC)
 Municipal Corporation Building, Mumbai (for details on the buildings architecture)
 Coat of arms of Mumbai
 Administrative divisions of Mumbai
 Mayor of Mumbai
 Sheriff of Mumbai

References

Mumbai civic officials
Waste managers
Municipal Commissioners of India
Brihanmumbai Municipal Corporation